Maryse is a given name. Notable persons with this name include:

Maryse Alberti, cinematographer
Maryse Condé, author
Maryse Dauvray, actress
Maryse Lassonde, neuropsychologist
Maryse Liburdi (formerly Maryse Thomas), CEO
Maryse Marpsat, sociologist
Maryse Joissains-Masini (formerly Maryse Charton), politician
Maryse Mitsouko, actress
Maryse Mizanin (formerly Maryse Ouellet), professional wrestler
Maryse Warda, translator

French feminine given names